Zelus is a genus of insects in the family Reduviidae, the assassin bugs. There are currently 60 described species; most occur in Central and South America, and five are found in North America.

Some species have been investigated for their potential as biocontrol agents in integrated pest management. Zelus is also known for a sticky trap predation strategy. Sticky resin produced from a leg gland is smeared on hairs to aid in prey capture. This is somewhat analogous to the carnivorous plant sundew.

Species include:
 Zelus annulosus
 Zelus araneiformis Haviland
 Zelus bilobus
 Zelus cervicalis
 Zelus exsanguis
 Zelus leucogrammus (Perty, 1833)
 Zelus longipes – milkweed assassin bug
 Zelus luridus Stål, 1862 – pale green assassin bug
 Zelus renardii – leafhopper assassin bug
 Zelus tetracanthus Stål, 1862

References

External links

 

Reduviidae
Cimicomorpha genera
Hemiptera of Central America